In the 20th century, the economy of Turkey has prospered thanks to a long period of steady economic growth, well above the average of the 1990s. It has become one of the world's emerging economies and one of the fastest growing countries in the world with a strong industrial base caused by an economic boom in the 2000s. In addition, Turkey's economic situation was relatively prosperous during the 2008 global financial crisis. The Turkish government has developed a series of macroeconomic policies in accordance with the new economic plan and the Turkish government has used the new government structure and cooperated with the International Monetary Fund, which has led to some good effects, including reducing the unemployment rate, higher education level, and increasing life expectancy. As a result, real GDP growth made Turkey one of the fastest growing countries in the 2000s. Turkish geopolitical strategy and geography are extremely important as it is the crossroads connecting Europe and Asia. Turkey is a founding member of the Organization of Economic Cooperation and Development, a member of the G20 and the NATO, and a candidate for the European Union.

History

Domestic politics 
After the establishment of the Turkish Republic, the new government committed itself to a relatively moderate economic policy. The basic direction of Turkey's economic development has been preliminarily determined, namely, the development of modern national industries, protection of customs duties, encouragement of private investment and absorption of foreign investment. At the same time, Economy Minister Mahmut Isat Pozkur as representative of the "new Turkish economics" illustrates the basic economic policies of the Turkish government in the 1920s, the principle of nationalism and liberalism dual economy, the state-owned economy and non-state economy coexist and mixed structure of national capital and foreign capital, to raise tariffs and restrict imports, to protect national industry, emphasizing the countries in the credit and dominant position in the field of industry.

In the 1930s, the Turkish government abandoned the relatively moderate liberal economic policies and promoted the radical nationalist economic policies, vigorously developed the state-owned economy, emphasized the principle of giving priority to industrial development, and expanded government intervention and investment in industrial production, aiming at accelerating the process of industrialization. Coping with the negative impact of the western economic crisis from 1929 to 1933 on the Turkish economy is the direct cause of the implementation of the nationalist policy in Turkey.

Global dynamics and foreign divestment 
The first President, Mustafa Kemal Atatürk announced that foreign companies and foreign businessmen would be allowed to invest in Turkey within the framework of the law in 1921. At the beginning of the Republic of Turkey, foreign capital played an important role in Turkey's economic life, with finance, railways, and mining under the control of foreign capital. In 1927, Anglo-French controlled Ottoman Banks provided about half of Turkey's production credit and even the right to issue notes. In 1930, the Turkish government established the Central Bank of the Republic of Turkey, which was responsible for the formulation of monetary policies and the regulation of money supply. At the same time, it recovered the right to issue notes and purchased foreign enterprises and railways and ports operated by foreign capital. The degree of nationalization of the national economy was significantly improved. In the 1950s, the Turkish government emphasized the liberal economic policies, encouraged private capital and foreign capital to invest in the industrial sector, and established the Turkish industrial development bank to provide loans to private entrepreneurs who invested in industry.

In 1954, the Turkish government promulgated the Foreign Investment Act (Act no. 6224), offering many preferential conditions to foreign investors, opening up the domestic market and attracting foreign investors. With investors from the US, West Germany, France and Italy the following suit, the modern industrial sector is the preferred investment for foreign investors.

The common development of private economy and state-owned economy 
During this period, the number and size of private enterprises have shown a trend of substantial growth. According to statistics, there were 660 private enterprises with more than 10 employees in 1951, 1,160 in 1953 and 5,300 in 1960. At the same time, the average number of workers employed by the private sector increased from 25 to 33.

Since the 1960s, the Turkish government take a series of positive measures, including tax rebates for private entrepreneurs in the emerging industry investment and preferential tariffs on imported equipment imported industrial tariffs and private companies to provide low-interest loans, to encourage the development of private enterprises, private enterprises accelerate the pace of development, production of private enterprises the soaring, the industrial structure of the private enterprises are also changing accordingly. The constitution promulgated in 1961 emphasizes the common development of the private economy and state-owned economy, the organic combination of market economy and planned economy, and the leading position of the state in the financial field. Investment in the state-owned economy is mainly concentrated in large enterprises that are capital – and technology-intensive, such as infrastructure construction and metallurgy and chemical industry. The investment sector of the private economy is mainly small and medium-sized enterprises that produce daily consumer goods such as food processing and textiles.

In this period, the mixed economic structure of state-owned organizations and private business coexisted for a long time, and state-owned companies and private enterprises were divided equally. State-owned organizations were few in numbers but large in scale; The number of business that owned by privates was huge, but the scale was small. Enterprises which owned by the state had advantages in capital, technology and production scale, and private enterprises had higher production efficiency and market competitiveness than state-owned enterprises. The input-output ratio of national enterprises was lower than the private sectors. The size of organizations owned by the state and their proportion in the total value of industrial output showed a trend of a gradual decline, while the size of private enterprises and their proportion in the total industrial output value showed an increasing trend. Still, the state sector had long dominated Turkey's industrial production.

Recovery and progression

New economic policies implemented in the 1980s 
In the 1980s, the Turkish government abandoned the import-important industrial development model, formulated new economic development strategies, encouraged private investment, expanded the market economy, established a free trade zone, and emphasized the competitiveness of the international market in the context of globalization. The export-oriented economic model has gradually matured. In January 1980, the Demirel government announced a new economic reform program, abandoning the industrialization strategy of inward-looking import substitution, reducing direct government intervention, reducing import tariffs, implementing liberalized economic policies, and formulating export-oriented and market-adjusted Economic strategy is a turning point in the history of Turkey's economic development model. Furthermore, Turgutz Özal was appointed as the deputy prime minister to oversee economic affairs. In the year after the military coup, Özal's economic recovery plan was initially implemented, and the inflation rate fell from 140% to 35%. The government's fiscal revenues and expenditures gradually became balanced.

After Özal was elected prime minister in 1983, he increased the implementation of new economic policies, devalued currencies, raised interest rates, frozen wages, encouraged private investment, attracted foreign investment, encouraged exports, relaxed import and export trade and currency restrictions, and increased export competitiveness. To alleviate the trade deficit, improve fiscal revenue and expenditure, and curb inflation. At the same time, the government is committed to transforming state-owned enterprises and promoting the privatization of state-owned enterprises. Since 1984, the government has abolished the preferential and subsidy policies enjoyed by state-owned enterprises, implemented fair competition between state-owned enterprises and private enterprises, and sold privately owned enterprises' securities and stocks to privately, canceled private investment restrictions, and expanded private investment.

Rapid economic growth in the 1990s 
The new economic policy implemented in the 1980s accelerated the development of the Turkish economy. The annual growth rate of GDP was 3.3% in 1983, 5.1% in 1985, and 7.5% in 1987. In contrast, the rate of economic development in the 1990s, except 1991 and 1994, generally exceeded the 1980s (annual growth in GDP, 9.4% in 1990 and 0.3% in 1991). In 1992, it was 6.4%, in 1993 it was 8.1%, in 1994 it was 6.1%, in 1995 it was 8%, in 1996 it was 7.1%, and in 1997 it was 8%).

On the other hand, the implementation of the new economic policy has led to a rapid increase in import and export trade. Along with the growth of import and export trade, the structure of export commodities has undergone significant changes; the export volume of industrial products has continued to rise, which constitutes a prominent phenomenon in the rapid development of the export-oriented economy in the 1990s. In 1990, Turkey's total exports increased to 13 billion U.S. dollars, of which the proportion of agricultural products in total exports fell to 25.5%, and the proportion of industrial products in total exports rose to 67.9%. In 1997, Turkey's total exports reached US$26.2 billion, of which agricultural products accounted for only 20.8% of total exports, and industrial products accounted for 74.9% of total exports.

Consequences of the new economic policy 
As a result of the rapid growth of population and the rapid progress of industrialization, Turkey's urbanization has also led to corresponding changes in the social structure, shaping a new social class.

The consequences of the new economic policy are the violent fluctuations in the economic field, the intensification of the polarization between the rich and the poor, which has a wide-ranging social influence and profound political influence. It is the historical background for the emergence of Islamism in the Turkish political arena. The inflation rate was lower than 40% in the early 1980s, 70% in 1987, and 1201% in 1992. In 1987, 20% of the rich had a 49.8% income; in 1994, 20% of the rich had a 50% income.

On the one hand, modern industrial workers have gradually emerged and become important social forces; on the other hand, the shanty towns where rural immigrants live have expanded year by year, and the urban poor have expanded dramatically. The 1950s was the fastest stage of urbanization. In the 1980s, the number of shanty towns around the city, the number of people living in the city, and the proportion of the urban population showed a significant upward trend. With the expansion of shanty towns around the city and the rapid expansion of the urban poor, the opposition between the rich and the poor in urban society has become increasingly prominent, and the collapse of the traditional order has led to the state of helplessness and serious unemployment in the lower classes moving from rural to urban areas, providing radical forces and soils that are highly inclined to breed.

Current economic status and future economy 
According to data released by the Turkish Statistical Office, gross domestic product (GDP) fell by 2.4% in the fourth quarter of 2017, which was the second consecutive quarter of economic decline after the third quarter contracted by 1.6%. Affected by the deterioration of the relationship between Turkey and the United States, the exchange rate crisis in Turkey. For the whole of last year, the Turkish lira fell by 30% against the US dollar. Due to the sharp depreciation of the lira, the cost of corporate debt repayment has increased, and many companies have filed for bankruptcy. In addition, Turkey is also facing high inflation problems. In October 2018, the consumer price index (CPI) rose by 25% year-on-year, a record high in 15 years.

See also

 Economy of Turkey
 History of Turkey

References

External links
 https://economics.rabobank.com/publications/2013/september/the-turkish-2000-01-banking-crisis/
 Turkey: From Empire to Revolutionary Republic; The Emergence of the Turkish Nation from 1789 to Present

Economy of Turkey
Economic booms